Gerard John "Jerry" Best (born May 8, 1963 in Queens, New York), is a Los Angeles-based hard rock bassist, songwriter and composer, active since 1984. He has played with bands such as Lion, Dio, Freak of Nature and Heavy Bones. Jerry was first introduced to his instrument by his older brother Tom, who showed him how to play the basic chords.

The most well-known works Best has played in include the theme song for the Transformers movie and the album Power Love with the band Lion. Over the years, Jerry has worked together with artists like Doug Aldrich, Mike Tramp, Courtney Love, Joel Ellis, Frankie Banali and Chuck Wright.

Personal life
Jerry was born in 1963 as the second child to the Best family. At that time, his family was living in Flushing Meadows in the borough of Queens in New York.

His family moved often after the job of Jerry’s father, and he ended up living in seven states during the first 18 years of his life. When he was around ten years old, his older brother Tom started teaching Jerry some chords, initially with an electronic guitar and later with a bass. Soon, they formed a band called Zeus, and played mostly at school and other local events.

Later, after graduating from high school, Jerry moved to Los Angeles, where his father and mother had already moved. In Los Angeles, Jerry played with bands such as T-zer and Mansfield, together with Pete Preston and Doug Aldrich.

Equipment
Best is currently endorsed by Seymour Duncan and Hipshot. He also uses products from Dunlop, ESP, GK, Fender and Ampeg. One of his previously-used bass guitars is currently on display at the Hard Rock Cafe in Moscow.

Discography

Mansfield
1983: Overdrive, Gonna Rock You

Lion
1986 – Power Love
1987 – The Wraith/movie soundtrack
1987 – The Transformers The Movie: Original Motion Picture Soundtrack
1987 – Dangerous Attraction
1989 – Trouble in Angel City

Freak of Nature
1992 – Freak of Nature
1993 – Rescue me
1994 – Gathering of Freaks
1998 – Outcasts
2002 – Freakology

Dio
1996 – Angry Machines

Mike Tramp
1997 – Capricorn
2004 – Songs I left behind

Courtney Love
2004 – America's Sweetheart
2004 – Fly (Japanese only)
2005 – The Simple Life Soundtrack

Other works
2000 – Ken Korade, KGB Records
2002 – Tracy G, Tracy G records
2003 – The SURGE, KGB Records
2013 – Manny Charlton, Hellacious, 4818 Records

References

External links
 Official website

American rock bass guitarists
1963 births
Living people
American male bass guitarists
20th-century American bass guitarists
20th-century American male musicians
Scotti Brothers Records artists